EPO or epo may refer to:

Organisations
 EPO (publisher), Belgium
 European Patent Office
 Evansville Philharmonic Orchestra, US

Science and technology
 Education and public outreach
 Electrolytic plasma oxidation, a metal surface treatment process 
 Emergency power off
 Erythropoietin, red blood cell production hormone 
 Evening primrose oil
 Eosinophil peroxidase, an enzyme

Other uses
 Esperanto (ISO 639-2 code), a constructed language
 Children Act 1989#Emergency protection order
 European Payment Order
 Exclusive provider organization, in US health insurance
 Emergency Powers Order per Irish 1939–1946 Emergency Powers Act 1939